Luis Gustavo Sánchez Blanco (February 2, 1934 − September 19, 2021) was a Spanish-Brazilian actor.

Born in Gothenburg, Sweden, he was the son of a Spanish diplomat, Luis Amador Sánchez Fernández, working in Sweden, and Elena Blanco Castañera, a Spanish woman. He came to live in Brazil at four years old, when his father arrived in the country to become the Spanish ambassador.

He started working as an assistant director at TV Tupi, accompanying his sister, the actress Helenita Sanches, appointed by Cassiano Gabus Mendes, the station's artistic director and his brother-in-law. Soon after, he had already participated in several films, telenovelas, and telethons until he starred as the eponymous anti-hero in the 1968 telenovela Beto Rockfeller. Since then he has consolidated his artistic career acting in several soap operas and films, mainly in comedy roles.

Death
Luís Gustavo died on September 19, 2021, in Itatiba, at the age of 87. He had been undergoing an intestine cancer treatment in 2018, having withdrawn from acting since then.

Filmography

Television

Cinema

References

1934 births
2021 deaths
Brazilian television actors
Brazilian film actors
Brazilian people of Spanish descent
People from Gothenburg